Marco Antonio Jiménez González (born 2 March 1981) is a former Mexican football midfielder. He played for Querétaro FC, and made his professional debut with Veracruz in 2005.

Trivia
Marco Jiménez scored the first goal for Querétaro FC since they returned to the Primera División de México. It was against CF Pachuca on July 31, 2009, during the Clausura 2009 tournament.

Honours

Club
Querétaro
Copa MX: Apertura 2016
Supercopa MX: 2017

References

External links

1981 births
Living people
Association football midfielders
Real Sociedad de Zacatecas footballers
Club Celaya footballers
C.D. Veracruz footballers
Querétaro F.C. footballers
Club Tijuana footballers
Leones Negros UdeG footballers
Footballers from Jalisco
Liga MX players
Ascenso MX players
People from Ciudad Guzmán, Jalisco
Mexican footballers